Rungsted Kyst station (meaning literally "the coast of Rungsted") is a railway station serving the suburb of Rungsted on the coast of North Zealand north of Copenhagen, Denmark.

The station is located on the Coast Line between Helsingør and Copenhagen. The train services are currently operated by the railway company DSB Øresund which runs a frequent Oresundtrain service between Helsingør and Malmö.

Rungsted Kyst is famous due to a range of Danish celebrity who grew up in the area including Simon Spies, wealthy eccentric and airline director, and Karen Blixen, world-famous writer. Johannes Ewald, well known Danish poet and writer, wrote about his happy convalescing there.

See also
 List of railway stations in Denmark

References

External links 
 
 PDF about the station

Railway stations in the Capital Region of Denmark
Heinrich Wenck buildings
Buildings and structures in Hørsholm Municipality
Art Nouveau railway stations
National Romantic architecture in Denmark
Railway stations in the Øresund Region